The Agartala flyover is a flyover in the Indian state of Tripura. The flyover, the first in the state, is 2.26 km long, stretching from the police line (Drop Gate) in southern Agartala to Fire Brigade chowmuhuni (square) in the heart of the city. The Construction is carried out by NCC and it was opened in 2019.
 The estimated cost of the project is around Rupees 250 crore (Rs. 2.5 billion).

See also

References

External links

Bridges and flyovers in Agartala
Transport in Agartala